The 2018 Fremantle Football Club season was the 24th season contested by the Fremantle Football Club in the Australian Football League. It was also the 2nd season in the AFL Women's league.

AFL

List changes

Before the 2017 season had begun, Shane Yarran retired due to dramas outside of football. Though he did not play in the 2017 season, he still took up a spot on their list throughout 2017. At the season's end veterans Zac Dawson and Garrick Ibbotson decided to retire from professional football. Neither was consistently playing in the senior team and both finished their careers playing for Peel Thunder in the WAFL. After the season had finished Fremantle announced that they would be delisting five players, including 100-gamer Zac Clarke and former  player Jonathon Griffin.  Nick Suban who had been awarded life membership at the 2017 Doig Medal event, was also delisted after nine years at the club.

During the 2017 trade period, Fremantle were active in a number of trades, but gaining and losing players and major draft picks. Initially the Giants wanted a top-20 draft pick for him, but on the last day of the draft period Fremantle were able to secure him by exchanging lower draft picks and giving the Giants one of their future draft picks.

Retirements and delistings

Trades

National draft

Rookie elevation

Rookie draft

Squad

Ladder

AFL Women's

References

Fremantle Football Club seasons
2018 Australian Football League season
2018 AFL Women's season